Brendan Peter O'Leary-Orange (born June 24, 1996) is a Canadian football wide receiver for the Winnipeg Blue Bombers of the Canadian Football League (CFL).

College career
O'Leary-Orange played college football for the Nevada Wolf Pack from 2016 to 2019 after taking a redshirt season in 2015.

Professional career
O'Leary-Orange was drafted in the fourth round, 37th overall, by the Winnipeg Blue Bombers in the 2020 CFL Draft, but did not play in 2020 due to the cancellation of the 2020 CFL season. He then signed with the team on April 26, 2021. He began the 2021 season on the practice roster, but was elevated to the active roster in week 14 where he played in his first professional game on November 6, 2021, against the Montreal Alouettes. He dressed in the last three regular season games as a backup receiver where he recorded two special teams tackles. He also played in both post-season games that year and won his first Grey Cup championship after the Blue Bombers defeated the Hamilton Tiger-Cats in the 108th Grey Cup championship game.

On September 10, 2022, in the Banjo Bowl game against the Saskatchewan Roughriders, O'Leary-Orange scored his first career touchdown on a 10-yard pass from Zach Collaros.

Personal life
O'Leary-Orange was born in Toronto, Ontario to parents Margaret O'Leary-Orange and Doyle Orange. He has two brothers, Daniel and Liam. His father also played professionally as a running back and played for the Toronto Argonauts and Hamilton Tiger-Cats.

References

External links
Winnipeg Blue Bombers bio
cfl.ca bio

1996 births
Living people
American football wide receivers
Canadian football wide receivers
Nevada Wolf Pack football players
Players of Canadian football from Ontario
Canadian football people from Toronto
Winnipeg Blue Bombers players